Frederick "Freddie" Douglas Waits (April 27, 1943 – November 18, 1989) was a hard bop and post-bop drummer.

Waits never officially recorded as leader, but was a prominent member and composer in Max Roach's M'Boom percussion ensemble. He worked as sideman with such pianists as McCoy Tyner, Kenny Barron, Andrew Hill, Gene Harris, Billy Taylor and Joe Zawinul. In 1967, Waits recorded with Freddie Hubbard. He was a member of the last Lee Morgan Quintet, an association ended by Morgan's murder in 1972.

In the late 1970s, Waits formed Colloquium III with fellow drummers Horace Arnold and Billy Hart. In the 1980s he became a music faculty member of Rutgers University. He died of pneumonia and kidney failure in New York in 1989.

His son is the drummer Nasheet Waits.

Discography

As sideman
With Roy Ayers 
Daddy Bug (Atlantic, 1969)
With Kenny Barron
You Had Better Listen (Atlantic, 1967) with Jimmy Owens
Sunset to Dawn (Muse, 1973)
Autumn in New York (Uptown, 1984)
With Gary Bartz
Another Earth (Milestone, 1969)
With Willie Bobo
A New Dimension (Verve, 1968)
With Ray Bryant
Gotta Travel On (Cadet, 1966)
Lonesome Traveler (Cadet, 1966)
Slow Freight (Cadet, 1967)
Sound Ray (Cadet, 1969)
With Kenny Burrell
Night Song (Verve, 1969)
With Donald Byrd
Mustang! (Blue Note, 1966)
With Stanley Cowell
We Three (DIW, 1987) 
With Richard Davis
Epistrophy & Now's the Time (Muse, 1972)
Dealin' (Muse, 1973)
Harvest (Muse, 1977 [1979])
Persia My Dear (DIW, 1987)
With Jack DeJohnette
The Jack DeJohnette Piano Album (Landmark, 1985)
With Bill Dixon 
Bill Dixon in Italy Volume One (Soul Note, 1980)
Bill Dixon in Italy Volume Two (Soul Note, 1980)
With Teddy Edwards 
The Inimitable Teddy Edwards (Xanadu, 1974)
With Ricky Ford
Looking Ahead (Muse, 1986)
With Curtis Fuller
Fire and Filigree (Bee Hive, 1978)
With Bunky Green
Places We've Never Been (Vanguard, 1979)
With Tiny Grimes
Profoundly Blue (Muse, 1973)
With Gene Harris
Gene Harris of the Three Sounds (1972)
With Andrew Hill
Grass Roots (Blue Note, 1968) 
Mosaic Select 16: Andrew Hill (Mosaic, 1969)
Lift Every Voice (Blue Note, 1969) 
Strange Serenade (Soul Note, 1980)
With Buck Hill
Capital Hill (Muse, 1990)
With Johnny Hodges
 Rippin' & Runnin' (Verve, 1968)
With Richard "Groove" Holmes
Soul Mist! (Prestige, 1966 [1970])
With Freddie Hubbard
High Blues Pressure (Atlantic, 1967)
With Willis Jackson
West Africa (Muse, 1973)
Headed and Gutted (Muse, 1974)
With Clifford Jordan
Hello, Hank Jones (Eastworld, 1978)
With Hubert Laws
Afro-Classic (CTI, 1970)
Carnegie Hall (CTI, 1973)
With Junior Mance
I Believe to My Soul (Atlantic, 1968)
With M'Boom
Re: Percussion (Strata-East, 1973)
M'Boom (Columbia, 1979) 
Collage (Soul Note, 1984)
With Charles McPherson
New Horizons (Xanadu, 1977)
With René McLean
Watch Out (SteepleChase, 1975)
With Mulgrew Miller and Reggie Workman
Trio Transition (DIW, 1987)
Trio Transition with Special Guest Oliver Lake (DIW, 1988)
With James Moody
The Blues and Other Colors (Milestone, 1969)
Feelin' It Together (Muse, 1973)
With Lee Morgan
The Last Session (Blue Note, 1971)
With Don Patterson
The Return of Don Patterson (Muse, 1972)
With Pharoah Sanders
Karma (Impulse!)
With Shirley Scott
Mystical Lady (Cadet, 1971)
With Buddy Terry
Electric Soul! (Prestige, 1967)
With McCoy Tyner
Time for Tyner (Blue Note, 1968) 
Expansions (Blue Note, 1968) 
Cosmos (Blue Note, 1977) 
With Joe Zawinul
The Rise and Fall of the Third Stream (Vortex, 1968)
With Denny Zeitlin
Cathexis (Columbia, 1964)

References

1943 births
1989 deaths
Post-bop drummers
Hard bop drummers
American jazz drummers
Deaths from kidney failure
Deaths from pneumonia in New York City
Musicians from Jackson, Mississippi
20th-century American drummers
American male drummers
Jazz musicians from Mississippi
20th-century American male musicians
American male jazz musicians
M'Boom members
20th-century African-American musicians